Vao is an Austronesian language of the Oceanic branch spoken by about 1,900 people on Vao Island and on the nearby shores of Malakula Island, Vanuatu.

Characteristics

Vao is one of the few languages of the world that possesses linguolabial consonants.

References

Malekula languages
Languages of Vanuatu